Sindhuli Gadhi is an historical fort and tourist attraction in central Nepal. Sindhuli Gadhi is famous for the battle between the then Gorkha Army and the British troop headed by Captain Kinloch. The Gorkha force under the command of Khajanchi Bir Bhadra Upadhyay and Sardar Banshu Gurung defeated the British troop in November 1767 (Kartik 24, 1824 BS).

Sindhuli Gadhi lies in Sindhuli District of Janakpur Zone. It is currently a tourist attraction.

Sindhuli Gadhi War

In connection to the unification of Nepal King Prithivi Narayan Shah surrounded the Kathmandu Valley and made an economic blockade.
The king of Kathmandu at the time, Jaya Prakash Malla, then wrote a letter to the British military in India, requesting for military assistance. 

In August 1767, when the forces of British India arrived in Sindhuli Gadhi, the Gorkha military conducted a guerrilla attack against them. Many of the British Indian forces were killed and the rest eventually fled, leaving behind a huge amount of weapons and ammunition, which were seized by the Gorkha army. 

Gorkha army under Banshu Gurung's command had prevented the British troops from advancing towards the Kathmandu Valley.

Gorkhas had used unconventional war tactics like unleashing the hornets and using nettles, among a variety of other tactics, to defeat the British soldiers.

Historical Commemoration
The Sindhuli War Memorial Day is celebrated every year in Sindhuli Gadhi to commemorate the victory of then Gorkha Army against British force. Nepal Army hoists the Nepali flag with salutation.

See also
Sindhuligadhi War Museum, war museum near the site

References

Forts in Nepal
Buildings and structures in Sindhuli District